Irthlingborough railway station is a former railway station in Irthlingborough, Northamptonshire, on the former  Northampton and Peterborough Railway line which connected Peterborough and Northampton. In 1846 the line, along with the London and Birmingham Railway, became part of the London and North Western Railway.

The station was opened by the London and Birmingham Railway on 2 June 1845, and was named Higham Ferrers. It was renamed Higham Ferrers and Irthlingborough on 28 April 1885, and renamed Irthlingborough on 1 October 1910. It was closed to passengers by British Railways on 4 May 1964.

At grouping in 1923 it became part of the London Midland and Scottish Railway.

The former service 
The service was from Peterborough to Northampton via Wellingborough. The station opened in 1845 and closed in 1964 to passengers.

References

External links
 Irthlingborough station on Subterranea Britannica

Railway stations in Great Britain opened in 1845
Railway stations in Great Britain closed in 1964
Disused railway stations in Northamptonshire
Former London and Birmingham Railway stations
Beeching closures in England
John William Livock buildings
North Northamptonshire